Aprigliano is a town and comune in the province of Cosenza in the Calabria region of southern Italy. It is located on the road from the Tyrrhenian Sea to the Lago Arvo, some 15 km from Cosenza.

See also
 Savuto river

References

Cities and towns in Calabria